Bill Fishman is an American film director, whose work includes the cult film Tapeheads, starring Tim Robbins and John Cusack, as well as the film version of the TV classic Car 54, Where Are You? He won an award at the 1999 New York International Independent Film & Video Festival and has also directed numerous music videos for such artists as The Ramones, Georgia Satellites, Hank Williams Jr., Suicidal Tendencies and Moloko.

Filmography
Tapeheads (1988) (also Co-Writer, with Peter McCarthy) 
Posse (1993) (Executive Producer) 
Car 54, Where Are You? (1994) (also co-writer with Ebbe Roe Smith, Peter Crabbe and Peter McCarthy) 
Desperate But Not Serious (a.k.a. "Reckless and Wild") (1999) 
My Dinner with Jimi (2003)
Waltzing with Brando (TBA)

Selected videography

Airbourne – "Blonde, Bad and Beautiful"
Arthur Baker and The Backbeat Disciples – "Talk It Over"
Backstreet Boys — "Last Christmas"
The Blank Theory – "Middle of Nowhere"
Blessid Union of Souls – "I Wanna Be There"
Bobby Jimmy and the Critters – "Roaches"
Brand New Heavies featuring Q-Tip – "Sometimes"
Brand New Heavies – "You Are the Universe"
Breakfast Club – "Drive My Car"
George Clinton – "Do Fries Go with That Shake?"
Bootsy Collins – "Party on Plastic"
Counting Crows – "Palisades Park"
Counting Crows – "Scarecrow"
The Decemberists – "Make You Better"
Dream Theater – "The Enemy Inside"
Eagles of Death Metal – "Speaking in Tongues"
Eve 6 – "Victoria"
Foxy Shazam – "I Like It"
Frickin' A – "Jessie's Girl"
Geggy Tah – "Whoever You Are"
The Georgia Satellites – "Keep Your Hands to Yourself"
The Georgia Satellites – "Myth of Love"
The Georgia Satellites – "Shake That Thang"
Good Charlotte – "Lifestyles of the Rich and Famous"
Grandmaster Flash – "Style"
Hank Williams Jr. featuring Van Halen – "My Name Is Bocephus"
Hank Williams Jr. featuring Kid Rock – "Naked Women and Beer"
Hank Williams Jr. – "Young Country"
Infectious Grooves – "Cousin Randy"
Joyce Irby  featuring Doug E. Fresh – "Mr. DJ"
The Jayhawks – "Big Star"
King Gordy – "Nightmares (Don't Let Me Fall Asleep)"
LA Dream Team – "Nursery Rhymes"
Lamb of God – "Redneck"
Los Amigos Invisibles – "Sexy"
Megadeth – "Head Crusher"
Megadeth – "The Right to Go Insane"
Moloko – "Fun for Me" (US)
The Monkees – "Heart and Soul"
New Edition – "You're Not My Kind of Girl"
Mojo Nixon and Skid Roper – "619-239-KING"
The Offspring – "Turning Into You"
Ramones – "I Wanna Be Sedated"
Ramones – "Pet Sematary"
Ramones – "Something to Believe In"
Ryan Cabrera – "40 Kinds of Sadness"
Saving Jane – "Girl Next Door"
The Sharks – "Only Time Will Tell"
Sir Mix-a-Lot – "Big Johnson"/"Carz"
Suicidal Tendencies – "Institutionalized"
Suicidal Tendencies – "Possessed to Skate"
Suicidal Tendencies – "Trip at the Brain"
Theory of a Deadman – "Hate My Life"
The Three O'Clock – "Jet Fighter"
Train – "If it's Love"
Train – "Save Me, San Francisco"
Wilco – "Outtasite (Outta Mind)"
Wilco – "Shot in the Arm"
Zap Mama featuring Erykah Badu – "Bandy Bandy"

References

External links 

Living people
American film directors
American music video directors
Year of birth missing (living people)